Sukanya Sang-Nguen (born 10 September 1966) is a Thai sprinter. She competed in the women's 4 × 400 metres relay at the 1992 Summer Olympics.

References

1966 births
Living people
Athletes (track and field) at the 1992 Summer Olympics
Sukanya Sang-Nguen
Sukanya Sang-Nguen
Sukanya Sang-Nguen
Place of birth missing (living people)
Asian Games medalists in athletics (track and field)
Sukanya Sang-Nguen
Athletes (track and field) at the 1994 Asian Games
Medalists at the 1994 Asian Games
Olympic female sprinters
Sukanya Sang-Nguen
Sukanya Sang-Nguen
Southeast Asian Games medalists in athletics
Sukanya Sang-Nguen